Krister Örnfjäder (born 1952) is a Swedish social democratic politician who was member of the Riksdag from 1993 to 2018. He was Father of the House from 25 April 2015 to 24 September 2018.

References
Krister Örnfjäder (S)

1952 births
Living people
Members of the Riksdag from the Social Democrats
Members of the Riksdag 2002–2006
Members of the Riksdag 1991–1994
Members of the Riksdag 1994–1998
Members of the Riksdag 1998–2002
Members of the Riksdag 2006–2010
Members of the Riksdag 2010–2014
Members of the Riksdag 2014–2018